Ronald Tubid  (born October 15, 1981) is a Filipino professional basketball coach and former player who is the team manager of the Terrafirma Dyip of the Philippine Basketball Association (PBA). He last played for the San Miguel Beermen of the PBA. Known by many as The Fearless, he was also known, along with backcourt tandem Mark Caguioa and Jayjay Helterbrand, as one-third of the so-called, The Fast, The Furious, and The Fearless. He was also known as The Saint for modeling for the portrait of San Pedro Calungsod when he was 17.

College career
Tubid was the only provincial player in the supposedly all-city college where he ended up being the team captain in his freshman year. He played college hoops in the University of the East in the UAAP.

His former UE Red Warriors teammates who ended up playing in the PBA are Niño Canaleta, James Yap, and Paul Artadi.

Tubid first saw action for ANA Water Dispenser before playing in a star-studded Welcoat Paintmasters squad of Rommel Adducul and Eddie Laure that won the 2002 PBL Challenge Cup.

PBA career
Tubid was drafted by the Shell Turbo Chargers as the sixteenth overall pick in the 2003 PBA draft and averaged 8.9 points in his rookie year. In his second season, he improved his mark to 12.3 points per game before being named Mr. Quality Minutes by the PBA Press Corps.

After Shell's disbandment following the 2004–05 PBA season, Tubid joined the Air21 Express and won his second Mr. Quality Minutes award while averaging 8.9 points in 44 games with just 11 starts.

At the midway point of the 2006–07 PBA Philippine Cup, Tubid was traded to the Barangay Ginebra Kings and was a key reliever in Ginebra's title conquest over sister team San Miguel Beer.

The next conference, Tubid made further improvements due to the absence of Mark Caguioa and Jayjay Helterbrand in the backcourt that eventually rewarded him with an All-Star Game appearance.

In the 2008 PBA Fiesta Conference, Tubid suffered a dislocated ankle injury in a game against Alaska that forced him to sit the rest of the quarterfinals and semifinals. When the Kings were in need of a scorer in Game 4 of the finals, he came off the bench and helped Ginebra even the series at 2-2. Then when the series went to a decisive 7th game, he stepped up when his team needed him most, scoring 20 points in the game to help the Kings win their 8th title. After the series, he along with teammate Eric Menk were named co-Finals MVP of the series. He also received multiple All-Star appearances as member of the Kings.

During the 2010–11 Philippine Cup, he changed his uniform number from 71 to 15 because it represents the date of his birthday.

On January 27, 2012, Tubid was as part of a three-team trade that sent him along with Reil Cervantes and a 2014 2nd round draft pick to the Barako Bull Energy, Kerby Raymundo and Dylan Ababou to the Barangay Ginebra Kings and JC Intal and a 2012 2nd round pick to the B-MEG Llamados. 

On January 23, 2013, Tubid was involved in a five-team, 10-player trade that sent him to Petron Blaze Boosters. The Blaze Boosters acquired Tubid while giving away Jojo Duncil and Fil-Am rookie Alex Mallari and Petron's 2014 first round pick (who turned out to be Anthony Semerad). He played a limited role off the bench and won five more championships with the franchise.

During the off-season of 2017, Tubid along with Rashawn McCarthy, Jay-R Reyes and a 2019 first-round draft pick were a part of the revised controversial trade between the San Miguel Beermen and the KIA Picanto that allowed the Beermen to have the no. 1 pick for the 2017 PBA draft who became Christian Standhardinger. On May 18, 2018, Tubid was named as an All-Star replacement for the injured Joe Devance for the Visayas leg of the 2018 All-Star Game.

PBA career statistics

Season-by-season averages

|-
| align=left | 
| align=left | Shell
| 34 || 17.4 || .363 || .298 || .779 || 3.7 || 1.0 || .7 || .2 || 8.9
|-
| align=left | 
| align=left | Shell
| 68 || 22.2 || .375 || .310 || .695 || 4.3 || 1.4 || .7 || .2 || 12.3
|-
| align=left | 
| align=left | Air21
| 44 || 18.5 || .353 || .319 || .766 || 4.0 || 1.4 || .6 || .1 || 8.9
|-
| align=left | 
| align=left | Air21 / Barangay Ginebra
| 51 || 25.9 || .424 || .324 || .707 || 4.0 || 1.9 || .8 || .2 || 11.5
|-
| align=left | 
| align=left | Barangay Ginebra
| 40 || 26.6 || .407 || .266 || .727 || 4.3 || 1.5 || .7 || .3 || 11.7
|-
| align=left | 
| align=left | Barangay Ginebra
| 48 || 27.8 || .407 || .366 || .789 || 4.5 || 1.8 || .5 || .2 || 12.2
|-
| align=left | 
| align=left | Barangay Ginebra
| 50 || 27.9 || .395 || .377 || .698 || 5.0 || 1.6 || .5 || .2 || 12.7
|-
| align=left | 
| align=left | Barangay Ginebra
| 58 || 27.1 || .397 || .363 || .723 || 4.3 || 1.5 || .4 || .3 || 10.5
|-
| align=left | 
| align=left | Barangay Ginebra / Barako Bull
| 42 || 26.0 || .361 || .322 || .655 || 4.4 || 1.7 || .6 || .1 || 8.1
|-
| align=left | 
| align=left | Barako Bull / Petron
| 49 || 24.7 || .366 || .289 || .714 || 3.9 || 1.5 || .5 || .1 || 7.4
|-
| align=left | 
| align=left | Petron / San Miguel
| 34 || 15.7 || .340 || .323 || .792 || 2.8 || .9 || .4 || .2 || 4.7
|-
| align=left | 
| align=left | San Miguel
| 52 || 15.8 || .437 || .350 || .800 || 2.4 || .7 || .3 || .1 || 6.6
|-
| align=left | 
| align=left | San Miguel
| 51 || 17.9 || .341 || .298 || .787 || 2.9 || .6 || .3 || .1 || 5.6
|-
| align=left | 
| align=left | San Miguel
| 47 || 12.6 || .353 || .319 || .667 || 1.9 || .5 || .1 || .0 || 3.7
|-
| align=left | 
| align=left | Kia / Columbian
| 30 || 17.5 || .396 || .409 || .759 || 3.2 || 1.1 || .4 || .2 || 6.7
|-
| align=left | 
| align=left | San Miguel
| 22 || 7.9 || .286 || .222 || .750 || 1.1 || .1 || .1 || .0 || 1.9
|-class=sortbottom
| colspan=2 align=center | Career
| 720 || 21.5 || .384 || .329 || .732 || 3.7 || 1.3 || .5 || .2 || 8.8

Awards and records

 2004 PBA 3-point Shootout Champion
 2004-05 PBA Mr. Quality Minutes
 2005-06 PBA Mr. Quality Minutes
 2008 PBA co-Finals Most Valuable Player
 2009 PBA All-Defensive Team
 66th member of the PBA's 5000 career points club

References

External links
Philippine Basketball Association profile
 ginebraonline.com
Barangay Ginebra Kings

1981 births
Living people
Barako Bull Energy players
Barangay Ginebra San Miguel players
Basketball players from Iloilo
Terrafirma Dyip players
Filipino men's basketball players
Filipino Roman Catholics
Hiligaynon people
Philippine Basketball Association All-Stars
Shell Turbo Chargers players
Shooting guards
Small forwards
Sportspeople from Iloilo City
San Miguel Beermen players
UE Red Warriors basketball players
Visayan people
Shell Turbo Chargers draft picks
Filipino men's basketball coaches
PBA 3x3 players
Filipino men's 3x3 basketball players
Terrafirma Dyip coaches